Zhukovskiy is a lunar impact crater that lies on the far side of the Moon. It forms a pair with Lebedinskiy, which is attached to the eastern rim. There are no other named craters of note in the immediate vicinity, although the immense walled plain Korolev lies farther to the southeast.

The rim of Zhukovskiy has become somewhat eroded, particularly at the northern and southern extremes. The interior floor is relatively level, although a small but prominent crater occupies part of the southern half.

Zhukovskiy lies to the southwest of the Dirichlet–Jackson Basin.

Satellite craters
By convention these features are identified on lunar maps by placing the letter on the side of the crater midpoint that is closest to Zhukovskiy.

References

 
 
 
 
 
 
 
 
 
 
 
 

Impact craters on the Moon